Mysore Colony is a monorail station of the Mumbai Monorail serving the only passenger Rail connectivity to Mahul region of Eastern Mumbai.

It gives direct connectivity to Bharat Petroleum Refinery, Tata Thermal Power Plant, Trombay MSETCL Substation from Chembur, Curry Road station, Lalbaug, Lower Parel railway station & Wadala Suburban Railway stations. It was opened to the public on 2 February 2014, as part of the first phase of Line 1. Mysuru Colony recorded the lowest passenger traffic among 7 stations of Line 1, during the first 3 days of operation.

References

Mumbai Monorail stations
Railway stations in India opened in 2014